Daag: A Poem of Love is a 1973 Indian Hindi-language romantic drama film produced and directed by Yash Chopra in his debut as a producer, which laid the foundation of Yash Raj Films. It is an adaptation of the 1886 Thomas Hardy novel The Mayor of Casterbridge. The film stars Rajesh Khanna, Sharmila Tagore and Raakhee in lead roles, with Madan Puri, Kader Khan, Prem Chopra and A. K. Hangal.

Daag was made at the peak of the Rajesh Khanna's craze and became a superhit at the box office. The music by Laxmikant Pyarelal dominated the charts for the year. The film was later remade into the Telugu film Vichitra Jeevitham (1978). This film was Kader Khan's debut as an actor.

At the 21st Filmfare Awards, Daag: A Poem of Love received 7 nominations, including Best Film, Best Actor (Khanna) and Best Actress (Tagore), and won 2 awards – Best Director (Chopra) and Best Supporting Actress (Raakhee).

Chopra used Raakhee's character name Chandni from this film also in his later films Silsila (1981) and Chandni (1989).

Plot
A young man, Sunil Kohli, falls for the beautiful Sonia. Soon, they get married and leave for their honeymoon. On the way, owing to bad weather, they decide to spend a night at a bungalow owned by Sunil's boss. The boss's son, Dheeraj Kapoor, tries to rape Sonia when she is alone. But Sunil arrives in time, and a fight ensues, resulting in the death of Dheeraj. Sunil is arrested and, later, sentenced to life imprisonment by the court. But, on the way to prison, the police van carrying him meets with an accident. All occupants are killed. 

Years later, Sonia, working as a school teacher and bringing up Sunil's and her son, finds out that her husband is still alive. He is living with a new identity as Sudhir, and is married to a rich woman named Chandni. After escaping from the police van, Sunil met Chandni, whose lover had ditched her on learning of her pregnancy. Sunil married her to provide legitimacy to her child, in return for her help in establishing his new identity. Now, after so many years, the law is once again at his doorstep. This time, however, there is an added crime to his name: bigamy.

Cast

Rajesh Khanna as Sunil Kohli / Sudhir
Sharmila Tagore as Sonia Kohli
Raakhee as Chandni
Prem Chopra as Dheeraj Kapoor
Baby Pinky as Pinky
Raju Shrestha (Master Raju) as Rinku
Manmohan Krishna as Deewan, Chandni's father
Madan Puri as K. C. Khanna
Achala Sachdev as Mrs. Malti Khanna
Iftekhar as Inspector Singh
Hari Shivdasani as Jagdish Kapoor
Yashodra Katju as School Principal
Kader Khan as Prosecuting attorney
A. K. Hangal as Prosecuting Attorney / Judge
S. N. Banerjee as Judge
Karan Dewan as Doctor Kapoor who treats Chandni's father
Surendra as Sunil's uncle
Jagdish Raj as Ram Singh (driver)
Manmohan as Prisoner in van fighting with Sunil
Padma Khanna as Dancer
 Aruna as Dancer
 Habib as Blacksmith removing Sunil's handcuffs
 Saul George as Jr. Artist

Crew
Director – Yash Chopra
Story – Gulshan Nanda
Dialogue – Akhtar-Ul-Iman
Producer – Yash Chopra
Editor – Pran Mehra
Art Director – R. G. Gaekwad
Cinematographer – Kay Gee
Stunts – Ravi Khanna, M. B. Shetty
Choreographer – Suresh Bhatt
Lyricist – Sahir Ludhianvi
Music Director – Laxmikant Pyarelal
Playback Singers – Kishore Kumar, Lata Mangeshkar, Rajesh Khanna

Soundtrack
The soundtrack includes the following tracks, composed by Laxmikant Pyarelal, and with lyrics by Sahir Ludhianvi
The song "Ab Chahe Ma Roothe Yaa Baba" was listed at #7 on Binaca Geetmala annual list 1973
The song "Mere Dil Mein Aaj Kya Hai" was listed at #20 on Binaca Geetmala annual list 1973

Awards and nominations
21st Filmfare Awards:

Won
Best Director – Yash Chopra
Best Supporting Actress – Raakhee
Nominated
Best Film
Best Actor – Rajesh Khanna
Best Actress – Sharmila Tagore
Best Music Director – Laxmikant Pyarelal
Best Male Playback Singer – Kishore Kumar for "Mere Dil Mein Aaj Kya Hai"

References

External links
 
 Daag (1973) at Yash Raj Films

1973 films
1970s Hindi-language films
Films directed by Yash Chopra
Yash Raj Films films
1973 romantic drama films
Films scored by Laxmikant–Pyarelal
Hindi films remade in other languages
Indian romantic drama films
Films based on The Mayor of Casterbridge